Juan Botella Medina (4 July 1941 – 17 July 1970) was a Mexican diver. He was born in Mexico City.

He competed for Mexico at the 1960 Summer Olympics held in Rome, where he won the bronze medal in the men's springboard event.
He died on 17 July 1970, in Basurto, Mexico City, working on his thesis on architecture, because of hypertension suffering for a long time.

References

External links
Juan Botella's profile at Sports Reference.com

 

1941 births
1970 deaths
Mexican male divers
Olympic bronze medalists for Mexico
Divers at the 1956 Summer Olympics
Divers at the 1960 Summer Olympics
Olympic divers of Mexico
Divers from Mexico City
Olympic medalists in diving
Medalists at the 1960 Summer Olympics
Pan American Games medalists in diving
Pan American Games bronze medalists for Mexico
Divers at the 1959 Pan American Games
Medalists at the 1959 Pan American Games
20th-century Mexican people